Imprisoned: Survival Guide for Rich and Prodigal, is a 2015 Hong Kong prison comedy film directed by Christopher Sun and starring Gregory Wong, Justin Cheung, Tommy Wong, Liu Kai-chi, Babyjohn Choi and Jessy Li. The film is based on an online novel published on HKGolden Forum. The film was released on 28 May 2015.

Cast
 Gregory Wong
 Justin Cheung
 Tommy Wong
 Liu Kai-chi
 Babyjohn Choi
 Jessy Li
 Candice Yu
 Elvis Tsui
 Ken Lo
 Philip Keung
 Lam Suet
 Wan Yeung-ming
 Deon Cheung
 Hanjin Tan
 Anita Chui
 Coffee Lam
 Aaron Chow
 Jack Hui
 Raymond Chiu
 Yang Jianping
 Tony Ho

Guest stars
 Frankie Ng
 Yuen Qiu
 William Ho
 Joyce Cheng

Box office
The film has grossed HK$3.12 million (US$403,000) on the first weekend. On the second weekend, the film has grossed HK$1.54 million (US$198,000) for a total of HK$5.99 million (US$772,000). On the third weekend, the film has grossed a total of HK$7.11 million (US$917,000).

References

External links
 
 
 

2015 films
Hong Kong comedy films
2015 comedy films
Prison comedy films
2010s Hong Kong films
2010s Cantonese-language films